Marc Kimmich (born 21 January 1983) is a former professional tennis player from Australia.

Kimmich was born in West Germany, but moved to Australia when he was five.

He received a wildcard entry into the 2005 Australian Open and played Mariano Zabaleta in the first round, losing in four sets. In the men's doubles he and partner Adam Feeney lost in the opening round to the Russian pairing of Igor Andreev and Nikolay Davydenko.

In the 2006 Australian Open, Kimmich was again given a wildcard, but he once more wasn't able to progress to the second round, with 26th seed Jarkko Nieminen proving too strong. He was also eliminated in the first round of the mixed doubles with Lisa McShea.

References

1983 births
Living people
Australian male tennis players
Tennis players from Brisbane
German emigrants to Australia